1. FC Saarbrücken (women) is women's association football team from Saarbrücken, Germany. It is part of the 1. FC Saarbrücken club.

History
In 1990 the women of VfR 09 Saarbrücken were a founding member of the Bundesliga.

In 1997 the women's football team of VfR 09 Saarbrücken left VfR to join 1. FC Saarbrücken. Up to 2010/11 the team has played in 16 Bundesliga seasons, since then they have been playing in the 2nd Bundesliga. The team's greatest success was an appearance in the 2008 DFB cup final where they lost 1–5 to 1. FFC Frankfurt.

Current squad

Former internationals

  Sif Atladóttir
  Cynthia Uwak

External links

Women's football clubs in Germany
Football clubs in Saarland
1997 establishments in Germany
Women
Association football clubs established in 1997
Frauen-Bundesliga clubs